Polypyrimidine tract-binding protein 1 is a protein that in humans is encoded by the PTBP1 gene.

This gene belongs to the subfamily of ubiquitously expressed heterogeneous nuclear ribonucleoproteins (hnRNPs). The hnRNPs are RNA-binding proteins and they complex with heterogeneous nuclear RNA (hnRNA). These proteins are associated with pre-mRNAs in the nucleus and appear to influence pre-mRNA processing and other aspects of mRNA metabolism and transport. While all of the hnRNPs are present in the nucleus, some seem to shuttle between the nucleus and the cytoplasm. The hnRNP proteins have distinct nucleic acid binding properties. The protein encoded by this gene has four repeats of quasi-RNA recognition motif (RRM) domains that bind RNAs. This protein binds to the intronic polypyrimidine tracts that requires pre-mRNA splicing and acts via the protein degradation ubiquitin-proteasome pathway. It may also promote the binding of U2 snRNP to pre-mRNAs. This protein is localized in the nucleoplasm and it is also detected in the perinucleolar structure. Alternatively spliced transcript variants encoding different isoforms have been described.

Evolution 

In brains of mammals, transcripts from the PTBP1 gene are missing one exon (exon 9) that is included in the brains of other vertebrates, as a result of alternative splicing. This contributes to the evolutionary difference between the nervous system of mammals and other vertebrates.

Interactions 

PTBP1 has been shown to interact with HNRPK, PCBP2, SFPQ and HNRNPL.

This gene is targeted by the microRNA miR-124. During neuronal differentiation, miR-124 reduces PTBP1 levels, leading to the accumulation of correctly spliced PTBP2 mRNA and a dramatic increase in PTBP2 protein.

References

Further reading